Document #12 is a split album by American screamo bands Pg. 99 and Majority Rule, originally released on CD on July 23, 2002, under the Magic Bullet Records. The LP edition of the album first became available on October 9 of the same year. It is noted for showing Pg. 99 experimenting with melody more than on their previous releases.

Track listing

Personnel
Pg.99
Blake Midgette – vocals
Brandon Evans – bass, vocals
Chris Taylor – vocals
George Crum – guitar
Johnny Ward – drums
Johnathan Moore – guitar
Kevin Longendyke – bass
Mike Taylor – guitar

Majority Rule
Kevin Lamiell – bass, vocals
Matt Michel – guitar, vocals
Pat Broderick – drums

Production
Chris Taylor – artwork
Matt Michel – layout, photography
Ben Mellot – production
Mike Bossier – recording

References

External links
 
 Document #12 on Bandcamp

Split albums
2002 albums
Pg. 99 albums